Casanova is a 2005 American romance film directed by Lasse Hallström starring Heath Ledger and loosely based on the life of Giacomo Casanova. The film premiered September 3, 2005, at the Venice Film Festival. 
It received mixed reviews and flopped at the box office.

Plot
A young woman tearfully leaves her son to live with his grandmother and promises to return for him someday. Several years later, in 1753, in Venice, Casanova is notorious for his promiscuity with women, his adventures being represented in puppet theatres around the city. The Doge, the ruler of the city, is a friend to Casanova, but cannot be too lenient on him as he wishes to avoid trouble with the Church. He warns Casanova to marry soon, or he will be exiled from the city. Casanova gets engaged to Victoria, famous for her virginity, to save himself from exile.

Casanova later meets and falls in love with Francesca Bruni, who writes illegal feminist books under the pseudonym of a man, Bernardo Guardi, and also argues for women's rights as Dr. Giordano de Padua. Francesca mistakes Casanova's name for Lupo Salvato (Casanova's servant) and Casanova humors her, since she hates the ill-reputed Casanova. Francesca and her mother are heavily in debt, and her mother pressures her to marry rich Paprizzio from Genoa, a union arranged by her late father. When Paprizzio arrives in Venice, Casanova lies to him and says that the hotel he booked is closed and he persuades him to stay at his house. Casanova also lies and says that he is indeed Bernardo Guardi. While Paprizzio asks his advice on how to impress Francesca, Casanova lures him to stay at home while receiving treatment for weight loss. Casanova visits Francesca, pretending to be Paprizzio and tells her that he lied to her before to make sure she is not in love with someone else and marrying him only for his money. Francesca is initially suspicious but gradually begins to trust him.

During the Venetian Carnival, Francesca recognizes the real Paprizzio from his publicity posters which force Casanova to confess his true identity making her angry. Casanova is arrested by the Venetian Inquisition for crimes against sexual morality, such as debauchery, heresy, and fornication with a novice. He saves Francesca by pretending to be Bernardo Guardi, which cools her anger. At his trial, Francesca confesses that she is the real Bernardo Guardi, and both are sentenced to death. Meanwhile, Francesca's mother and the real Paprizzio fall in love.

Just as Casanova and Francesca are about to be hanged in the Piazza San Marco, they are saved by an announcement that the Pope gave amnesty to all prisoners who were to be executed on that day, as it was the Pope's birthday. It is later discovered that the "Cardinal" who gave the announcement was actually an impostor who happens to be Casanova's stepfather, wedded to his long-lost mother who came back for him just as she promised when Casanova was a child.

As they all escape on Paprizzio's boat, Francesca's brother, Giovanni stays behind to marry Victoria and to continue Casanova's legendary womanizing. The real Casanova spends the rest of his life as a stage actor touring with his family and the Paprizzios.

Cast

Production
Director Lasse Hallström had long wanted to make a film about Casanova but postponed the project to make "An Unfinished Life" with Robert Redford. The script was originally written by Kimberly Simi. It was later redrafted by Michael Cristofer. Tom Stoppard gave the script an uncredited polish. Producer Leslie Holleran also polished the script.

Filming began on July 9, 2004, and the finished film was released in the United States on September 3, 2005. Visual effects for the film were produced by Custom Film Effects and Illusion Arts. Period costumes were supplied by four different Italian costume houses: Tirelli Costumi, Nicolao Atelier, Costumi d'Arte, and G.P. 11, and shoes were manufactured by L.C.P. di Pompei. Wardrobe was also rented from Sastreria Cornejo of Spain.

The film was shot on location in Venice.
Additional scenes were filmed in Vicenza, particularly the Teatro Olimpico, the Renaissance theater known for its intricate forced perspective stage design.
The hot air balloon scene was created using Computer Generated Imagery (CGI).

Music
 Assagio No. 1 in G Minor (Andante), composed by Johan Helmich Roman
 Concerto à 5, Op. 9 No. 10 in F Major for Violin, Strings & Continuo (2. Adagio), composed by Tomaso Albinoni
 Concerto à 5, Op. 9 No. 4 in A Major for Violin, Strings & Continuo (2. Adagio), composed by Tomaso Albinoni
 Concerto à 5, Op. 9 No. 2 in D Minor for Oboe, Strings & Continuo (1. Allegro e non presto), composed by Tomaso Albinoni
 Concerto à 5, Op. 9 No. 6 in G Major for 2 Oboes, Strings & Continuo (3. Allegro), composed by Tomaso Albinoni
 Tambourins I/II from the tragédie lyrique Dardanus, composed by Jean-Philippe Rameau
 Overture from the tragédie lyrique Zoroastre, composed by Jean-Philippe Rameau
 Air Grave from the tragédie lyrique Zoroastre, composed by Jean-Philippe Rameau
 Menuetts 1 & 2 from the tragédie lyrique Zoroastre, composed by Jean-Philippe Rameau
 Air Gai from the opéra-ballet Le temple de la Gloire, composed by Jean-Philippe Rameau
 Overture from the opéra-ballet Le temple de la Gloire, composed by Jean-Philippe Rameau
 Overture from the opéra-ballet Les fêtes de Polymnie, composed by Jean-Philippe Rameau
 Overture from the comédie-ballet Platée, composed by Jean-Philippe Rameau
 Gavotte from the opéra-ballet Les Indes galantes, composed by Jean-Philippe Rameau
 Rigaudons en Rondeau from the opéra-ballet Les Indes galantes, composed by Jean-Philippe Rameau
 Overture from the pastorale Acante et Céphise, composed by Jean-Philippe Rameau
 Ballet Figure (1st Gavotte) from the pastorale Naïs, composed by Jean-Philippe Rameau
 Overture from the pastorale Naïs, composed by Jean-Philippe Rameau
 Overture from the pastorale Zaïs, composed by Jean-Philippe Rameau
 Cello Concerto No. 3 in D Minor (2. Amoroso), composed by Leonardo Leo
 Concerto in C Major for Mandolin, Strings & Continuo (1. Allegro), composed by Antonio Vivaldi
 Concerto in D Major for Lute, 2 Violins & Continuo (3. Allegro), composed by Antonio Vivaldi
 Sinfonia from the opera Farnace, composed by Antonio Vivaldi
 Violin Concerto Il cimento dell'armonia e dell'invenzione, Op. 8, No. 11 in D Major (2. Largo), composed by Antonio Vivaldi
 Concerto for 2 Violins, Cello & Strings L'estro armonico, Op. 3, No. 2 in G Minor (1. Adagio e spiccato), composed by Antonio Vivaldi
 Harpsichord Concerto in B Flat Major (2. Grave), composed by Francesco Durante
 Harpsichord Concerto in B Flat Major (1. Allegro non troppo), composed by Francesco Durante
 Concerto for 2 Violins, Viola & Continuo No. 8 in A major La Pazzia (1. Allegro), composed by Francesco Durante
 Concerto in C Major for Harpsichord & Strings (2. Larghetto, 3. Rondo), composed by Giovanni Paisiello
 Overture from La Madrilena, composed by Vicente Martín y Soler
 Casanova's Lament, traditional music, original lyrics by Björn Ulvaeus, performed by Tommy Körberg
 Sonata for Violin & Continuo, Op. 5 No. 11 in E Major (5. Gavotta - Allegro), composed by Arcangelo Corelli
 Sonata for Violin & Continuo, Op. 5 No. 7 in D Minor (3. Sarabanda - Largo), composed by Arcangelo Corelli
 Bourée from Plaisirs Champêtres, composed by Jean-Féry Rebel
 Tastar de Corde, Recercar Dietro, composed by Joan Ambrosio Dalza and performed by Christopher Wilson and Shirley Rumsey
 Rigaudon from Water Music, Suite No. 3 in G Major, composed by Georg Friedrich Händel
 Bourée from Music for the Royal Fireworks, composed by Georg Friedrich Händel
 Loure from Tafelmusik 1, composed by Georg Philipp Telemann
 Bella Gioiosa, composed by Fabritio Caroso

Reception
On Rotten Tomatoes the film has a score of 44% based on reviews from 131 critics. The site's consensus states: "This frothy, oddly bloodless film does a disservice to the colorful life of the real Casanova." On Metacritic it has a score of 57% based on reviews from 36 critics, indicating "mixed or average reviews". Audiences surveyed by CinemaScore gave the film a grade "B" on scale of A to F.

Roger Ebert of the Chicago Sun-Times gave it 2 out of 4 and wrote: "That the new Casanova lacks such wit is fatal. Heath Ledger is a good actor but Hallstrom's film is busy and unfocused, giving us the view of Casanova's ceaseless activity but not the excitement. It's a sitcom when what is wanted is comic opera." A.O. Scott of The New York Times called it "a delightful respite from awards-season seriousness" and rated it 4 out of 5.

References

External links
 

2005 films
2005 romantic comedy films
American romantic comedy films
Films directed by Lasse Hallström
Films about Giacomo Casanova
Films set in Venice
Films set in the 1750s
Touchstone Pictures films
American historical romance films
American swashbuckler films
Fiction set in 1753
Films scored by Alexandre Desplat
2000s historical romance films
2000s English-language films
2000s American films